This is an alphabetical list of plants used in herbalism.

Phytochemicals possibly involved in biological functions are the basis of herbalism, and may be grouped as: 
primary metabolites, such as carbohydrates and fats found in all plants
secondary metabolites serving a more specific function.

For example, some secondary metabolites are toxins used to deter predation, and others are pheromones used to attract insects for pollination. Secondary metabolites and pigments may have therapeutic actions in humans, and can be refined to produce drugs; examples are quinine from the cinchona, morphine and codeine from the poppy, and digoxin from the foxglove.

In Europe, apothecaries stocked herbal ingredients as traditional medicines. In the Latin names for plants created by Linnaeus, the word officinalis indicates that a plant was used in this way. For example, the marsh mallow has the classification Althaea officinalis, as it was traditionally used as an emollient to soothe ulcers. Pharmacognosy is the study of plant sources of phytochemicals.

Some modern prescription drugs are based on plant extracts rather than whole plants. The phytochemicals may be synthesized, compounded or otherwise transformed to make pharmaceuticals. Examples of such derivatives include aspirin, which is chemically related to the salicylic acid found in white willow. The opium poppy is a major industrial source of opiates, including morphine. Few traditional remedies, however, have translated into modern drugs, although there is continuing research into the efficacy and possible adaptation of traditional herbal treatments.

A

B

C

D

E

F

G

H

I

J

K

L

M

N

O

P

Q

R

S

T

U

V

W

X

Y

Z

Databases

See also 

 Chinese classic herbal formula
 History of birth control
 List of branches of alternative medicine
 List of culinary herbs and spices
 List of herbs with known adverse effects
 Materia Medica
 Medicinal mushrooms
 Medicinal plants of the American West
 Medicinal plants traditionally used by the indigenous peoples of North America
 Naturopathic medicine
 Wikispecies

Notes 
 Digitalis use in the United States is controlled by the U.S. Food and Drug Administration and can only be prescribed by a physician. Misuse can cause death.
 This encyclopedia is not a substitute for medical advice nor a complete description of these herbs, their dangers (up to and including death), and their (in)compatibility with alcohol or other drugs.

References

Further reading

External links 
 
 

01
01
Medicine
Plants used as medicine
Plants used as medicine
Garden plants
Traditional medicine
Commercialization of traditional medicines
Bioethics
Botany
Plant genetics
Biodiversity
Plant conservation
Plant breeding
Seeds
Sustainable agriculture

id:Tanaman obat keluarga
lt:Vaistiniai augalai